Carpathonesticus caucasicus  is a species of araneomorph spider of the family Nesticidae. It occurs in Georgia, where it is found in caves.

Original publication

References 

Nesticidae
Spiders described in 1947
Spiders of Georgia (country)